Zain Abbas (born 16 April 1986) is a Pakistani-born cricketer who has played one One Day International for Hong Kong.

External links

1986 births
Living people
Hong Kong One Day International cricketers
Hong Kong cricketers
Pakistani emigrants to Hong Kong
Sportspeople of Pakistani descent